TNA may refer to:

Organisations
 Tamil National Alliance, a political coalition in Sri Lanka
 The National Alliance, a political party in Kenya
 The National Archives (United Kingdom), a UK public body
 Tonga Nurses' Association, a trade union
 Trans Nation Airways, an Ethiopian charter airline

Science and technology
 Threose nucleic acid, an artificial genetic polymer
 2,4,6-Trinitroaniline, a nitrated amine
 Time and attendance, a system that monitors and records employee attendance

Sports
 Total Nonstop Action Wrestling, now known as Impact Wrestling, American professional wrestling promotion
 Torneo Nacional de Ascenso, a division of the Argentine basketball league

Transport
 TNA, IATA code for Jinan Yaoqiang International Airport, China
 TNA, ICAO code for TransAsia Airways
 TNA, National Rail code for Thornton Abbey railway station

Other uses
 TNA (Airborne nuclear warhead), a French thermonuclear warhead
 TNA, a clothing brand of Aritzia
 tna, ISO 639 code for Tacana language
 TNA Media, owner of The New Age
 TNA Park, a multi-use stadium in Tarkwa, Ghana
 Tashi Namgyal Academy, a public school in Sikkim, India
 The New American, a print magazine
 Training needs analysis, the process of identifying the gap between training and needs

See also

Mr. TNA (disambiguation)
T & A (disambiguation)